Emmanuelle Pironneau (born 19 December 1978) is a former tennis player from France. She competed during her career as Emmanuelle Curutchet.

Biography
Curutchet played on the professional tour in the 1990s and had a best ranking in singles of 160 in the world.

She appeared in the women's singles main draw at the French Open on three occasions. At the 1999 French Open she won a first-round match against Jelena Dokic 11–9 in the third set. Dokic would famously upset Martina Hingis at Wimbledon a month later.

Now known as Emmanuelle Pironneau, she retired after the 1999 season and currently runs a sports management company in Pau.

ITF finals

Singles: 6 (3–3)

Doubles: 7 (4–3)

References

External links
 
 

1978 births
Living people
French female tennis players